José Ángel García (30 October 1950 – 22 January 2021) was a Mexican stage and television actor and director. He was the father of actor Gael García Bernal.

García began acting at the age of fourteen, appearing in various telenovelas. He was a director of the long running Mexican anthology drama television series La rosa de Guadalupe.

References

External links

1950 births
2021 deaths
Mexican male telenovela actors
Mexican television directors
Male actors from Michoacán
People from Huetamo
20th-century Mexican male actors
21st-century Mexican male actors